Recurrent miscarriage is three or more consecutive pregnancy losses. In contrast, infertility is the inability to conceive. In many cases the cause of RPL is unknown. After three or more losses, a thorough evaluation is recommended by American Society of Reproductive Medicine. About 1% of couples trying to have children are affected by recurrent miscarriage.

Causes 

There are various causes for recurrent miscarriage, and some can be treated. Some couples never have a cause identified, often after extensive investigations. About 50–75% of cases of recurrent miscarriage are unexplained.

Chromosomal disorders 

A balanced translocation or Robertsonian translocation in one of the partners leads to unviable fetuses that are miscarried. This explains why a karyogram is often performed in both partners if a woman has experienced repeated miscarriages.

Aneuploidy may be a cause of a random spontaneous as well as recurrent pregnancy loss. Aneuploidy is more common with advanced reproductive age reflecting decreased germ cell quality.

Larger chromosomal disorders are generally detected on karyotype. In couples where a miscarried embryo has an abnormal karyotype, 76% of subsequent miscarried embryos have shown abnormal karyotypes as well. On the other hand, this group of couples have a better long-term live birth rate than those where miscarried embryos have normal karyotype.

Lifestyle factors 

While lifestyle factors have been associated with increased risk for miscarriage in general, and are usually not listed as specific causes for RPL, every effort should be made to address these issues  in patients with RPL. Of specific concern are chronic exposures to toxins including smoking, alcohol, and drugs.

Anatomical conditions 
Fifteen percent of women who have experienced three or more recurring miscarriages have some anatomical reason for the inability to complete the pregnancy. The structure of the uterus has an effect on the ability to carry a child to term. Anatomical differences are common and can be congenital.

Cervical conditions 

In the second trimester a weak cervix can become a recurrent problem. Such cervical incompetence leads to premature pregnancy loss resulting in miscarriages or preterm deliveries. It has been estimated that cervical insufficiency is a cause in about 8% of women with second trimester recurrent miscarriages.

Endocrine disorders 

Women with hypothyroidism are at increased risk for pregnancy losses. Unrecognized or poorly treated diabetes mellitus leads to increased miscarriages. Women with polycystic ovary syndrome also have higher loss rates possibly related to hyperinsulinemia or excess androgens. Inadequate production of progesterone in the luteal phase may set the stage for RPL (see below).

Thrombophilia 

An important example is the possible increased risk of miscarriage in women with thrombophilia (propensity for blood clots). The most common problem is the factor V Leiden and prothrombin G20210A mutation. Some preliminary studies suggest that anticoagulant medication may improve the chances of carrying pregnancy to term but these studies need to be confirmed before they are adopted in clinical practice. Note that many women with thrombophilia go through one or more pregnancies with no difficulties, while others may have pregnancy complications. Thrombophilia may explain up to 49–65% of recurrent miscarriages.

Immune factors 

A common feature of immune factors in causing recurrent pregnancy loss appears to be a decreased maternal immune tolerance towards the fetus.

Antiphospholipid syndrome 

The antiphospholipid syndrome is an autoimmune disease that is a common cause of recurrent pregnancy loss. Around 15% of the women who have recurrent miscarriages have high levels of antiphospholipid antibodies. Women who have had more than one miscarriage in the first trimester, or a miscarriage in the second trimester, may have their blood tested for antibodies, to determine if they have antiphospholipid syndrome. Women diagnosed with antiphospholipid syndrome generally take aspirin or heparin in subsequent pregnancies, but questions remain due to the lack of high quality trials.

Thyroid antibodies 

Anti-thyroid autoantibodies are associated with an increased risk of recurrent miscarriage with an odds ratio of 2.3 with a 95% confidence interval of 1.5–3.5.

Increased uterine NK cells 

Natural killer cells, a type of white blood cell, are present in uterine tissue. High levels of these cells may be linked to RPL but high numbers or the presence of these cells is not a predictor of pregnancy loss in women who have not have had a miscarriage.

Parental HLA sharing 

Earlier studies that perhaps paternal sharing of HLA genes would be associated with increased pregnancy loss have not been confirmed.

Male-specific minor histocompatibility 

Immunization of mothers against male-specific minor histocompatibility (H-Y) antigens has a pathogenic role in many cases of secondary recurrent miscarriage, that is, recurrent miscarriage in pregnancies succeeding a previous live birth. An example of this effect is that the male:female ratio of children born prior and subsequent to secondary recurrent miscarriage is 1.49 and 0.76 respectively.

Ovarian factors

Luteal phase defect 

The issue of a luteal phase defect is complex. The theory behind the concept suggests that an inadequate amount of progesterone is produced by the corpus luteum to maintain the early pregnancy. Assessment of this situation was traditionally carried out by an endometrial biopsy, however recent studies have not confirmed that such assessment is valid. Studies about the value of progesterone supplementation remain deficient, however, such supplementation is commonly carried out on an empirical basis.

Infection 
Infections are estimated to be responsible for between 0.5 and 5% of cases with recurrent miscarriage. The main suspected pathogens are mycoplasma, ureaplasma, Chlamydia trachomatis, Listeria monocytogenes, and herpes simplex virus. An infectious evaluation may be warranted in people with immunodeficiency, or with signs of chronic endometritis/cervicitis on examination. Otherwise, there is no evidence that routine infectious evaluation is appropriate or productive.

Chronic endometritis (CE) due to common bacteria has been found to be prevalent in some women with a history of recurrent miscarriage. One study found that 71 percent of women who tested positive for this condition were successfully treated by an antibiogram-based antibiotic treatment. 78.4 percent of these women subsequently became pregnant in the year following treatment. The study concludes that "CE is frequent in women with recurrent miscarriages," and that "antibiotic treatment seems to be associated with an improved reproductive outcome." The authors also conclude, "that hysteroscopy should be a part of the diagnostic workup of infertile women complaining of unexplained recurrent miscarriage." Despite challenges in diagnosing chronic endometritis, often done by identifying plasma cells within the lining of the womb, a recent study identified women with chronic endometritis were more likely to have a miscarriage than women without.

Assessment 

Transvaginal ultrasonography has become the primary method of assessment of the health of an early pregnancy.

In non-pregnant patients who are evaluated for recurrent pregnancy loss the following tests are usually performed.
Parental chromosome testing (karyogram) is generally recommended after 2 or 3 pregnancy losses. Blood tests for thrombophilia, ovarian function, thyroid function and diabetes are performed.

Treatment 

If the likely cause of recurrent pregnancy loss can be determined treatment is to be directed accordingly. In pregnant women with a history of recurrent miscarriage, anticoagulants seem to increase the live birth rate among those with antiphospholipid syndrome and perhaps those with congenital thrombophilia but not in those with unexplained recurrent miscarriage. One study found that in many women with chronic endometritis, "fertility was restored after appropriate antibiotic treatment."

There are currently no treatments for women with unexplained recurrent pregnancy loss. The majority of patients are counseled to try to conceive again, and chances are about 60% that the next pregnancy is successful without treatment. However, each additional loss worsens the prognostic for a successful pregnancy and increases the psychological and physical risks to the mother. Aspirin has no effect in preventing recurrent miscarriage in women with unexplained recurrent pregnancy loss. Immunotherapy has not been found to help. There is currently one drug in development, NT100, which is in clinical trials for the treatment of unexplained recurrent miscarriage. The study investigates the role of NT100 in improving maternal-fetal tolerance for women with unexplained recurrent miscarriage.

In certain chromosomal situations, while treatment may not be available, in vitro fertilization with preimplantation genetic diagnosis may be able to identify embryos with a reduced risk of another pregnancy loss which then would be transferred. However, in vitro fertilization does not improve maternal-fetal tolerance imbalances.

Close surveillance during pregnancy is generally recommended for pregnant patients with a history of recurrent pregnancy loss. Even with appropriate and correct treatment another pregnancy loss may occur as each pregnancy develops its own risks and problems.

Psychological effects of miscarriages 

There is significant, and often unrecognized, psychological and psychiatric trauma for the mother – for many, miscarriage represents the loss of a future child, of motherhood, and engenders doubts regarding her ability to procreate.

"There is tremendous psychological impact of recurrent miscarriage. Psychological support in the form of frequent discussions and sympathetic counseling are crucial to the successful evaluation and treatment of the anxious couple. When no etiologic factor is identified, no treatment started at 60% to 80% fetal salvage rate still may be expected. Therefore, couples with unexplained recurrent miscarriage should be offered appropriate emotional support and reassurance."

Association with later disease 

Recurrent miscarriage in itself is associated with later development of coronary artery disease with an odds ratio of approximately 2, increased risk of ovarian cancer, increased risk of cardiovascular complications, and an increased risk of all-cause mortality of 44%, 86%, and 150% for women with a history of 1, 2, or 3 miscarriages, respectively.

Women with a history of recurrent miscarriage are at risk of developing preeclampsia in later pregnancies.

References

Bibliography

External links 

Fertility medicine
Fertility
Noninflammatory disorders of female genital tract
Miscarriage